"Who Says" is the thirteenth single released by American singer-songwriter John Mayer, and the first to be released from his fourth studio album, Battle Studies. It is Mayer's first studio recorded single release since "Say" in 2007. On September 25, 2009, "Who Says" was released on John Mayer's official website.

Music video
The song's music video shows images of Mayer clubbing and dining out at night-time paired with scenes of him alone in his apartment, cleaning up and noodling on his guitar. Referencing the video, Leah Greenblatt of Entertainment Weekly asked "Who says the life of a rock star—sexy entourage, late-night pool parties, nubile young things dancing on banquettes—is just a mask for acoustic ennui? John Mayer, that's who," and gave the video a "B".

Reception

Critical
Critical reception of "Who Says" was mixed; though most praised the song musically, some were skeptical of Mayer's explicit reference to drug use.  Crystal Bell of Billboard magazine gave a favorable review from the song, saying, "'Who Says' balances Mayer's signature velvety tone with a more stripped-down, folk-inspired arrangement." She added, "Mayer may not be speaking in grandiose terms about changing the world or marveling over a woman's beauty, but maybe that's the point." Leah Greenblatt of Entertainment Weekly said of the single "Mayer channels Cat Stevens, Jason Mraz, and every camp counselor you ever had on this soft-rockin' celebration of women, wild times, and getting stoned." and gave the song a "B".

Commercial
On the week ending October 31, 2009, "Who Says" debuted at No. 17 on the Billboard Hot 100, making it his sixth and final top twenty hit and fourth highest-charting single on the Hot 100 to date. However, it also marks his lowest-charting single to date on the Billboard Adult Top 40 chart, peaking at No. 19, thus snapping a recent streak of five consecutive singles to reach the Top Ten on the format. By the week ending November 21, 2009, the song had reached number one on Billboard's Triple A chart. With this single, Mayer tied Jack Johnson for most Triple A number ones (six) among male artists.

In Australia, "Who Says" peaked at No. 31 on the ARIA Singles Charts and is certified gold for sales of 35,000 copies.

Charts

Year-end charts

Certifications

Controversy
The song's opening line ("Who says I can't get stoned?") has been taken to refer to cannabis intoxication. Rolling Stone published this quote from Mayer on his take on the line, indicating that this is a simplistic interpretation: "When I sing it, I do not think about marijuana — I think about walking around your house naked with a guitar. It's about being in control of the pleasure in your life."

Personnel
John Mayer – vocals, guitars, record producer
Steve Jordan – drums, production
Pino Palladino – bass
Ian McLagan – pump organ, celeste

References

External links
"Who Says" music video on YouTube

2009 singles
John Mayer songs
Music videos directed by Anthony Mandler
Songs written by John Mayer
Rock ballads
2009 songs
Columbia Records singles